Cesário Lange is a Brazilian municipality in the state of São Paulo. It is part of the Metropolitan Region of Sorocaba, and the statistical mesoregion of Itapetininga and microregion Tatuí.

History

The municipality was founded in December 12, 1878 by João Mendes de Almeida, according to Law No. 29/64. It was assigned town category under Law No. 5285 of February 18, 1959, implemented January 1, 1960. Its political emancipation was made under Law No. 28 of August 19, 1966. The town was named in honor of Cesario Lange Adrien, its first teacher. Almeida built the first chapel in the city, dedicated to Santa Cruz, which was subsequently enlarged into a church.

Highways

 SP-280: Rodovia Presidente Castelo Branco.
 SP-143: Cesário Lange / Pereiras - Rodovia Marechal Rondon.
 SP-141: Cesário Lange / Porangaba.
 SP-127: Cesário Lange / Tatuí.
 Highway Otávio Pilon: Vicinal Cesário Lange / Cerquilho - Rodovia do Açúcar.

Economy and religion

Agriculture, industry, religious tourism and leisure are some of the economic activities practiced in the city, which is a breeding center thoroughbred horses.

In the city of Cesário Lange, is the Associação Torre de Vigia de Bíblias e Tratados (Watch Tower Bible and Tract Association), the Brazilian headquarters of Jehovah's Witnesses religious group. That site is organized the work of the Witnesses in the country and print millions of Bible literature that are sent to all the Portuguese-speaking world, including Portugal.

References

Municipalities in São Paulo (state)